Arnold Graffi (19 June 1910 – 30 January 2006) was a pioneering German doctor in the area of experimental cancer research. 

Graffi was born in the Saxon town of Bistritz (Bistrița) in Transylvania, then part of Austria-Hungary. He studied medicine at Marburg, Leipzig, and Tübingen before receiving his doctorate at the Charité in Berlin. Graffi worked at the Paul Ehrlich Institute in Frankfurt. He taught at the Humboldt University of Berlin from the mid-1940s until 1975, when he retired.

After retirement Graffi continued to be involved in cancer research, but more in the area of chemotherapy and the problems related to it. 

He received various awards throughout his life including the Academy of Natural Scientists Cothenius Medal in 1977, the Paul Ehrlich Prize in Frankfurt in 1979, the Helmholtz Medal of the Academy of Sciences in Berlin in 1984, an honorary doctorate from the University of Leipzig in 1990, and the Cross of the Order of Merit from the German government in 1995.

Graffi died in Berlin in 2006.

External links
 Obituary of Dr. Graffi

1910 births
2006 deaths
People from Bistrița
Transylvanian Saxon people
German oncologists
Commanders Crosses of the Order of Merit of the Federal Republic of Germany
Members of the German Academy of Sciences at Berlin
Romanian emigrants to Germany